The B Line is one of seven RapidRide lines (routes with some bus rapid transit features) operated by King County Metro in King County, Washington. The B Line began service on October 1, 2011, running between downtown Redmond, Overlake and downtown Bellevue. The line runs mainly via NE 8th Street, 156th Avenue NE, NE 40th Street and 148th Avenue NE. Unlike most of the RapidRide lines, the B Line does not offer scheduled service during late-night and early morning hours.

History
This corridor was previously served Metro routes 230 and 253 which carried a combined average of 5,070 riders on weekdays during the last month in service. Since the implementation of RapidRide on the corridor, ridership has grown 30 percent and the B Line served an average of 6,600 riders on weekdays in spring 2015.

Service

All times are estimated headways.

References

External links
B Line website
RapidRide website
RapidRide Blog
King County Metro

Bus transportation in Washington (state)
Transportation in King County, Washington
Transportation in Seattle
2011 establishments in Washington (state)
2011 in transport
King County Metro